Dehuyeh (also Romanized as Dehūyeh and Dehvieh; also known as Dehū and Dohū) is a village in Ij Rural District, in the Central District of Estahban County, Fars Province, Iran. At the 2006 census, its population was 462, in 103 families.

References 

Populated places in Estahban County